In music, standard tuning refers to the typical tuning of a string instrument. This notion is contrary to that of scordatura, i.e. an alternate tuning designated to modify either the timbre or technical capabilities of the desired instrument.

Violin family

The most popular bowed strings used nowadays belong to the violin family; together with their respective standard tunings, they are:
 Violin – G3 D4 A4 E5 (ascending perfect fifths, starting from G below middle C)
 Viola – C3 G3 D4 A4 (a perfect fifth below a violin's standard tuning)
 Cello – C2 G2 D3 A3 (an octave lower than the viola)
 Double bass – E1 A1 D2 G2 (ascending perfect fourths, where the highest sounding open string coincides with the G on a cello).
 Double bass with a low C extension – C1 E1 A1 D2 G2 (the same, except for low C, which is a major third below the low E on a standard 4-string double bass)
 5-stringed double bass – B0 E1 A1 D2 G2 (a low B is added, so the tuning remains in perfect fourths)

Viol family 
The double bass is properly the contrabass member of the viol family. Its smaller members are tuned in ascending fourths, with a major third in the middle, as follows:
 Treble viol – D3 G3 C4 E4 A4 D5 (ascending perfect fourths with the exception of a major third between strings 3 and 4)
 Tenor viol – G2 C3 F3 A3 D4 G4 (a perfect fifth below the treble viol)
 Bass viol – D2 G2 C3 E3 A3 D4 (an octave lower than the treble viol)
 7-stringed bass viol – A1 D2 G2 C3 E3 A3 D4 (an extra low A is added)
A more recent family is the violin octet, which also features a standardized tuning system (see page).

Guitar family

Guitars and bass guitars have more standard tunings, depending on the number of strings an instrument has.
 six-string guitar (the most common configuration) – E2 A2 D3 G3 B3 E4 (ascending perfect fourths, with an exception between G and B, which is a major third). Low E falls a major third above the C on a standard-tuned cello.
 Renaissance lute – E2 A2 D3 F♯3 B3 E4 (used by classical guitarists for certain pieces; identical to standard guitar tuning, except for the F♯, lowered one semitone from the standard G string, making a perfect fourth between 2nd and 3rd rather than 3rd and 4th strings)
 seven-string guitar – B1 E2 A2 D3 G3 B3 E4 (identical, except for the low B, which is a perfect fourth below the low E on a 6-stringed guitar)
 four-string bass guitar (most popular) – E1 A1 D2 G2 (its standard tuning coincides with that of a 4-stringed double bass)
 five-string bass – B0 E1 A1 D2 G2 (identical to 4-stringed bass with the addition of a low B string a perfect fourth below the E).
 six-string bass – B0 E1 A1 D2 G2 C3 (identical to 5-stringed bass with the addition of a high C string a perfect fourth above the G).
 Baritone (older use) / 6 string bass (older use) such as the Fender Bass VI – E1 A1 D2 G2 B2 E3 (Similar to a standard guitar but an octave lower, and often played like a standard guitar rather than a bass guitar.)
 Baritone guitar (contemporary versions) – B1 E2 A2 D3 F♯3 B3 a fourth below standard tuning, although A1 to A3; a fifth lower is also used.
 12-string guitar  E3 E2 A3 A2 D4 D3 G4 G3 B3 B3 E4 E4 in six two-string courses.

Other 
Other plucked string instruments and their respective standard tunings include:
 Banjo (Five-stringed): G4 D3 G3 B3 D4 for bluegrass; old time and folk banjoists use this and a wide variety of other tunings
 Mandola: C3 G3 D4 A4 (same as standard viola tuning)
 Mandolin: G3 D4 A4 E5 (same as standard violin tuning)
 Pipa: A2 D3 E3 A3 (most common and used in Chinese orchestra; several other tunings exist)
 Balalaika (Prima): E4 E4 A5 (the two identical Es are on strings of different gauges)
 Requinto Jarocho: A3 D3 G3 C4 (G string tuned the same as a guitar's)
 Ukulele (Soprano): G4 C4 E4 A4 (C6) and A4 D4 F♯4 B4

See also
 List of guitar tunings
 Musical tuning
 Scordatura

References
 

Musical tuning